Ryan Geoffrey Sullivan (born 20 January 1975, in Fitzroy, Victoria) is a retired Australian international Motorcycle speedway rider who has won the Australian Solo Championship, Australian Under-21 Speedway Championship, and Under-16 championships during his career. Sullivan achieved a career best third in the 2002 Speedway Grand Prix, winning two of the ten Grand Prix run during the year.

Career

Australia

Juniors
Sullivan's family moved from Melbourne to Adelaide in the late 1970s, and as a child Sullivan played Australian Rules Football, but became interested in speedway when it became obvious that he was not of the ideal build to be a league footballer.

His parents bought him a junior speedway bike and he had his first ride at the Olympic Park Speedway in Mildura in 1985, although his home track was the Sidewinders Speedway in the Adelaide suburb of Wingfield, a 112m long track run by the Sidewinders Junior Speedway Club solely aimed at junior Motorcycle speedway development. Within a few seasons Sullivan was seen as one of the best junior riders in South Australia, winning the South Australian Under-16 Individual title in 1990 and 1991 while winning the Pairs Championships in 1988, 1989, 1990 and 1991.

Sullivan finished in second place at the 1990 Australian Under-16 Championship in Perth behind future Australian teammate and three time World Champion Jason Crump. He would go one better on 12 January 1991 winning his first individual Australian title at his home track in Adelaide.

Ryan Sullivan won three Australian Under-16 Pairs Championships, first in 1989 with that year's National Individual Champion Brett Tomkins, and backing that up in 1990 teaming with fellow Adelaide rider Troy Norvil. He won his third and last junior pairs title on 13 January 1991 paired with Brett Woodifield, a week before his 16th birthday at which time he would graduate into the senior ranks. Due to e missed winning the

Seniors
Sullivan's first senior speedway championship came on 14 April 1991 when he won the track championship at the Westline Speedway in South Australia's "steel city" Whyalla, just three months after graduating to the senior ranks. Sullivan was unbeaten in the heats to finish on 12 points, 4 clear of meeting favourite Brett Tomkins before going on to win the final from Paul Schevienen and Troy Norvill.

After having gained his motor mechanic qualifications at age 19, Sullivan was regarded one of the best young riders in Australia, going on to win three South Australian Championships in succession in 1995, 1996 and 1997, and the Australian Under-21 Championship in 1993 and 1996 (the championship was not held in 1994 or 1995). Other than his 1993 Under-21 title which was won at the Olympic Park Speedway in Mildura, his 1996 U/21 title and his state title wins came at his home track, the North Arm Speedway. As North Arm closed at the end of the 1997 season, Sullivan is the last rider to win the SA Championship at the track.

One of the first big wins of Sullivan's career came when he took out Round 4 of the 1996 Australian Speedway Masters Series 500 at the  Wayville Showground at home in Adelaide, holding out England's multiple Long Track World Champion Simon Wigg in the final.

Sullivan scored his first podium finish in the Australian Championship in 1997 at the  Brisbane Exhibition Ground when he finished equal second on points with Jason Crump, but lost a run-off to Crump and was credited with third place. He again finished in third place in 2002 at the Wayville Showground.

In 2004, Sullivan became the first South Australian rider to win the Australian Championship since John Boulger in 1973 when he won the first year that the championship was run as a series (held over 3 rounds), rather than the single meeting format that had been in place since the first running of the title in 1926. Sullivan was undefeated over the three rounds held at the Gold Coast, Gosford and Olympic Park speedways. He defeated defending champion Leigh Adams who finished 2nd in all three rounds, with 1990 World #3 Todd Wiltshire finishing in third with 2 fourth and 1 third placings. This would prove to be Sullivan's only Australian Championship win and the final time he stood on the podium of the event.

England
Sullivan has spent most of his British career with the Peterborough Panthers, and although he had not ridden in Britain since 2006, in August 2008 he returned to ride for Peterborough until the end of that season. He has also ridden for the Poole Pirates but returned to the Panthers on a full transfer in 2006. He went on to ride in Sweden (Rospiggarna), Poland (Unibax Torun) and Russia (Togliatti). He returned to Peterborough in 2012 to replace the injured Kenneth Bjerre, but suffered a hand injury which ended his season and led to announcing his retirement from the sport in March 2013.

International
Sullivan qualified for the 1995 and 1996 Under-21 World Championships. He finished third in 1995 at the Kaanaa Speedway Stadium in Tampere, Finland (won by Jason Crump). Sullivan finished in a 4-way tie on 12 points and defeated Tomáš Topinka (Poland), Kai Laukkanen (Finland) and Ben Howe (England) in a runoff to claim third place. In his final shot at winning the title before turning 22, he improved to second in 1996 behind Poland's Piotr Protasiewicz (who scored a 15-point maximum) at the Speedwaybahn in Olching, Germany. Sullivan defeated Danish rider Jesper B. Jensen in a runoff to finish second in 1996 after both finished the meeting on 11 points.

Sullivan's first big international career win came when he defeated triple-Australian Champion Leigh Adams in a runoff to win the 1995 Overseas Final in Coventry, England. Sullivan became the first Australian winner of the Overseas Final which had been in place since 1981.

In 1997, Sullivan became the first Australian to win the Intercontinental Final when he led home an Aussie 1-2-3 (with Jason Crump and Craig Boyce) in Västervik, Sweden.

In both 1997 and 2003, Sullivan won the prestigious Golden Helmet of Pardubice at the Svítkov Stadion in the Czech Republic, his 1997 title being the first for any Australian rider.

In 1999, Sullivan was part of the Australian team that took out the Speedway World Team Cup, Australia's first WTC win since 1976. He was also a member of the team when Australia won the Speedway World Cup in 2001 and 2002. He finished second in the SWC in 2003, third in 2007 and fourth in both 2006 and 2008.

Sullivan's last major win came in 2009 at the Alfred Smoczyk Memorial in Leszno, Poland.

Speedway Grand Prix
Sullivan was a Speedway Grand Prix rider from 1998 until 2006 and won four Grand Prix meetings. In the 2002 Speedway Grand Prix series he won the British Grand Prix in Cardiff and the Slovenian Grand Prix in Krško. In the 2003 Speedway Grand Prix series he won the Swedish Grand Prix in Avesta and the Scandinavian Grand Prix in Gothenburg, Sweden.

In September 2008, he made it through to the Grand Prix Challenge – the final of the 2009 Grand Prix qualification rounds. Despite winning his first three heats, he only scored one point in his following two rides and failed to qualify for the 2009 Speedway Grand Prix.

World Final Appearances

World Team Cup
 1999 -  Pardubice, Svítkov Stadion (with Jason Crump / Jason Lyons / Leigh Adams / Todd Wiltshire) - Winner - 40pts (12)
 2000 -  Coventry, Brandon Stadium (with Jason Crump / Todd Wiltshire / Leigh Adams / Craig Boyce) - 4th - 29pts (2)

World Cup
 2001 -  Wrocław, Olympic Stadium (with Jason Crump / Todd Wiltshire / Craig Boyce / Leigh Adams) - Winner - 68pts (13)
 2002 -  Peterborough, East of England Showground (with Todd Wiltshire / Jason Lyons / Leigh Adams / Jason Crump) - Winner - 64pts (17)
 2003 -  Vojens, Speedway Center (with Jason Crump / Todd Wiltshire / Jason Lyons / Leigh Adams) - 2nd - 57pts (10)
 2006 -  Reading, Smallmead Stadium (with Travis McGowan / Todd Wiltshire / Leigh Adams / Jason Crump) - 4th - 35pts (4)
 2007 -  Leszno, Alfred Smoczyk Stadium (with Jason Crump / Chris Holder / Leigh Adams / Davey Watt / Rory Schlein) - 3rd - 29pts (7)
 2008 -  Vojens, Speedway Center (with Leigh Adams / Chris Holder / Jason Crump / Davey Watt) - 4th - 21pts (5)

Individual Under-21 World Championship
 1995 -  Tampere, Kaanaa Speedway Stadium - 3rd - 12+3pts
 1996 -  Olching, Olching Speedwaybahn - 2nd - 11+3pts

Speedway Grand Prix results

References

Australian speedway riders
Speedway World Cup champions
1975 births
Living people
Sportspeople from Melbourne
Polonia Bydgoszcz riders
Peterborough Panthers riders
Poole Pirates riders
Australian expatriate sportspeople in Poland
Expatriate speedway riders in Poland